Eloisa Garcia Tamez (born March 2, 1935) is a Lipan Apache civil rights leader, lecturer, professional nurse, professor and retired officer of the United States Army's Nursing Corps. She is a prominent opponent and litigant against the Texas-Mexico border wall.

Early life
Born in Cameron County, Texas to Jose Cavazos Garcia (of Lipan Apache, Comanche, and Hispanic descent) and Lydia Esparza Garcia (Nahua, Basque, and Hispanic), Eloisa Garcia Tamez was raised in a traditional Indigenous community with her sibling, grandparents, cousins, and extended family. Her birth community is located within the historical land-base of the Lipan Apache.

Education
Following schooling in La Encantada and San Benito High School, she received a Bachelor of Science in Nursing from Incarnate Word College in 1968. She received a Master of Science in Nursing from the University of Texas Health Science Center at San Antonio School of Nursing in 1973 and a Ph.D. in Health Education from the University of Texas at Austin in 1985.

Early activism
In the summer of 1952, she led her community members in a local struggle against the discriminatory effects of the controversial consolidation of Landrum District #3 with the San Benito Independent School District, which would have favored white and elite families over the poorer land owners in traditional rancherias. She achieved high status among the rancherias during this struggle to advance the civil rights of the poorer, indigenous and Mexican-American families in 'Deep South Texas'. Her community referred to her as "La Chata, prieta y justa" ["Chata, Indian and just"].

Military service
Tamez worked at the Audie L. Murphy Department of Veterans Affairs Medical Center in San Antonio, Texas from 1972 to 1982. From 1982 to 1999, she was an officer, rising to the rank of lieutenant colonel, in the United States Army Reserve. During this time, she was an assistant chief nurse or chief nurse at VA hospitals in San Juan, Puerto Rico; Hot Springs, South Dakota; and Cleveland, Ohio. On October 25, 2008, she was sworn into the Texas State Guard Medical Brigade as Commander for the Rio Grande Valley Company.

Current activism
In 2007, Tamez co-founded the Lipan Apache Women Defense, an Indigenous Peoples Organization. Registered at the United Nations Permanent Forum on Indigenous Issues, the organization serves to educate the public regarding contemporary Lipan Apaches and Lower Rio Grande indigenous peoples' legal challenges to human rights violations by the Department of Homeland Security in the process of constructing the Texas-Mexico border wall.

Awards and honors
2008: Henry B. Gonzalez Civil Rights Award
2008: Provost's Hispanic Heritage Award, University of Texas-Pan American
2003: Alumna of Distinction, University of the Incarnate Word
1994: Fellow of the American Academy of Nursing
1994: "A" Proficiency Designator, United States Army Medical Department

References
Handbook of Texas Online:
Nuevo Santander
Jose Esparza (1856-1926) 
El Calaboz, Texas
Apache Indians
Land Grants

External links
Highlights in the History of the Army Nurse Corps: appendices
Texas State Guard Medical Brigade (MRC), Recent Information, "LTC Tamez Sworn In"
"Filling a Void, Tamez Sworn in as Medical Brigade Commander". Mid-Valley Town Crier, October 28, 2008
"Eloisa ... Opens Her Gates To Border Fence Surveyors", Rio Grande Guardian, April 22, 2008
"Holes in the Wall". Melissa del Bosque, The Texas Observer, February 22, 2008
"Holes in the Wall - Texas Border Wall Bypassing Wealthy Residents With Bush Admin Ties", Amy Goodman, Democracy Now!
"Dispatches from the Border Wall", Melisssa del Bosque, The Texas Observer, February 22, 2008
 Dallas News, 07:55 AM CST on Thursday, January 10, 2008. "Border landowners face legal battle in fence plan. U.S. preparing cases; opponents say ancestral rights are at stake"
ABC News: "Government May Sue over Border Fence"
Infoshop News, Sunday, January 20 2008 "Indigenous Alliance in solidarity with Apaches at Texas border"
Latina Lista.net
"Homeland Security Sues Lipan Apache Eloisa Tamez for Land for Border Wall"
"Texas Border Mayors Sue Homeland Secretary Chertoff", Cox News Service, May 17, 2008
"South Texas Groups Sue DHS to Restore Environmental Laws along the Border", Lone Star Chapter Sierra Club, May 30, 2008
"Border Fence Lawsuit to be Filed Friday; County Also Joins TBC Action", May 27, 2008
"Lipan Apache - Stop the Border Wall Construction", Apache Times, December 23, 2008
"Letter to Obama, regarding the Border Wall" (opinion page)
"Movements Afoot to Demolish the U.S.-Mexico Border Wall", Kent Paterson, Mexidata.info
"Border wall appealed to U.S. Supreme Court", December 10, 2008
Copy of Lawsuit: Eloisa Garcia Tamez, Benito J. Garcia, Plaintiffs vs. Michael Chertoff, Secretary, U.S. Department of Homeland Security, et al., Defendants

1935 births
Living people
American nursing administrators
Hispanic and Latino American people
People from Cameron County, Texas
People from San Benito, Texas
University of Texas at Austin alumni
University of Texas Health Science Center at San Antonio alumni
Fellows of the American Academy of Nursing
Nursing researchers
United States Army Nurse Corps officers
United States Army reservists
Nursing educators
Apache people
Women in the United States Army
Activists for Hispanic and Latino American civil rights
Hispanic and Latino American teachers
20th-century Native Americans
21st-century Native Americans
Native American United States military personnel
Native American women in warfare
Native American activists
Activists from Texas
Educators from Texas
American women educators
20th-century Native American women
21st-century Native American women
Military personnel from Texas